I'll Stay with You may refer to:

Songs
"I'll Stay with You", a song by Beth Hart from Leave the Light On
"I'll Stay with You", a song by Luna Sea, B-side of "Limit"
"I'll Stay with You", a song by Russell Morris from A Thousand Suns and Almost Frantic
"I'll Stay with You", a song by New Order from Lost Sirens
"I'll Stay with You", a song from the soundtrack of There Goes the Bride

Other uses
 I'll Stay with You (film) or Ich bleib' bei Dir, a 1931 German romantic comedy film